Jitterbug Junction is an album by American jazz percussionist Kahil El'Zabar's Ritual Trio, which also includes saxophonist Ari Brown and bassist Malachi Favors. It was recorded in 1997 and released on CIMP.

Reception

In his review for AllMusic, Scott Yanow notes "Although at times El'Zabar's drums are rather loud in the balance (particularly on the opening track), this is very much a democracy and there are strong moments and lots of close interplay by the three musicians."

Track listing
All compositions by Kahil El'Zabar except where noted
 "From Whence It Came" – 9:37
 "Jitterbug Junction" – 6:38
 "One for John" (Billy Brimfield) – 10:00
 "The Sweet Nectar of Cacophony" – 16:08
 "Ash'E" – 5:49
 "This Little Light of Mine" (Traditional) – 12:46

Personnel
Kahil El'Zabar – drums, thumb piano, vocals
Ari Brown – tenor sax, soprano sax
Malachi Favors – bass

References

1997 albums
Kahil El'Zabar albums
CIMP albums